The Williams House (also known as the Swain House or Langston Apts. or Allen Boarding House) is a historic home in Tallahassee, Florida, United States. It is located at 450 Saint Francis Street. On April 4, 1996, it was added to the U.S. National Register of Historic Places.

References

External links
 Leon County listings at National Register of Historic Places

Historic buildings and structures in Leon County, Florida
Houses on the National Register of Historic Places in Florida
National Register of Historic Places in Tallahassee, Florida
History of Tallahassee, Florida
Houses in Tallahassee, Florida